The following are  lists of angels:

 List of angels in theology
 List of spirits appearing in grimoires (mentions angels several times)
 List of angels in fiction
 List of Angels in Neon Genesis Evangelion
 List of angels in Supernatural
 List of films about angels

See also
 Lists of demons